Kazimierz Wajda (3 December 1905 in Lwów - 8 May 1955 in Warsaw), stage name Szczepko, was a Polish actor and comedian. He worked and lived in prewar Polish Lwów (now Lviv, Ukraine). Together with Henryk Vogelfänger he was a star of the radio comedy duo "Szczepko and Tońko", which was widely popular in Poland and abroad. Three movies were also made, along with comedian Stanisław Sielański.

Selected filmography 
 The Vagabonds (1939)
 Będzie lepiej (1936)

References

External links 

 
 Kazimierz Wajda at the Polish Internet Movie Database 
 Popular Kazimierz Wajda and Henryk Vogelfänger videos on YouTube

1905 births
1955 deaths
Polish male actors
Polish comedians
Actors from Lviv
20th-century Polish male actors
20th-century comedians
People from the Kingdom of Galicia and Lodomeria
Polish Austro-Hungarians